Melrose, also known as the Williamson House, is a historic plantation house located near Yanceyville, Caswell County, North Carolina.  It consists of two two-story, frame blocks connected by a -story breezeway.  The original section dated to about 1780 and is a two-story, frame single pile block with Federal style details.  The later section was built about 1840, and is a two-story, frame single pile block with Greek Revival style details. The later section features a portico supported by four unfluted Doric order columns. Also on the property is an octagonal, Williamsburg-style pump house
with a conical roof.

It was added to the National Register of Historic Places in 1985.

References

External links

Plantation houses in North Carolina
Historic American Buildings Survey in North Carolina
Houses on the National Register of Historic Places in North Carolina
Federal architecture in North Carolina
Greek Revival houses in North Carolina
Houses completed in 1840
Houses in Caswell County, North Carolina
National Register of Historic Places in Caswell County, North Carolina